Metamesia episema is a species of moth of the family Tortricidae. It is found in Ethiopia, Kenya, Madagascar and South Africa (Western Cape, KwaZulu-Natal).

References

	

Moths described in 1960
Archipini